The Missa Mi-mi is a musical setting of the Ordinary of the Mass by Johannes Ockeghem. It is a motto mass based on one of Ockeghem's own chansons, "Presque transi." The mass contains several motives and ideas from this chanson beyond just the head-motive.

Music
The mass is for four voices, and is in the usual parts:

 Kyrie
 Gloria
 Credo
 Sanctus
 Agnus Dei

Source and Naming

The most authoritative source for this mass is the Chigi codex. Here, the mass appears as 'Mi-mi.' Other early sources are generally untitled, or it is sometimes referred to as "Missa Quarti toni" ( or "Mass in Mode 4"). There has been much debate about what the solmization designation of 'Mi-mi' refers too, and whether this title was given by Ockeghem. Earlier scholars generally assumed that 'Mi-mi' referred to the opening bass motive, which would involve the solmization syllables 'mi' and 'mi' in the normal and soft hexachord, respectively. Rebecca Stewart points out that using the hard hexachord is most likely the way a Renaissance singer would approach this interval, which would avoid the need for mutation. Ross W. Duffin has more recently proposed that 'Mi-mi' is possibly another way to refer to Mode 4 - through defining the solmization of the outer limits of the two hexachords used in the mode.

Notes

References
 Leeman Perkins, "Johannes Ockeghem."  Grove Music Online, ed. L. Macy (Accessed December 2, 2020), (subscription access)
 Burkholder, J. Peter, et al. A History of Western Music. 9th ed., W. W. Norton & Company, 2014. pp. 191–195.
 Duffin, Ross W. “Mi chiamano Mimi … but My Name is Quarti toni: Solmization and Ockeghem's Famous Mass.” Early Music, May 2001, Vo. 29, No. 2, pp. 164– 180+183-184. Oxford University Press, 2001. 
 Godt, Irving. “An Ockeghem Observation: Hidden Canon in the "Missa Mi-Mi?" Tijdschrift van de Vereniging voor Nederlandse Muziekgeschiedenis, 1991, Deel 41, No. 2 (1991), pp. 79–85. Koninklijke Vereniging voor Nederlandse Muziekgeschiedenis (KVNM), 1991. 
 Miyazaki, Haruyo. “New Light on Ockeghem's “Missa ‘Mi-mi.’” Early Music, Aug, 1985, Vol. 13, No. 3, pp. 367-375. Oxford University Press, 1985. 
 Stewart, Rebecca. “... Ita desiderat anima mea ad te, Deus (Ps.42:1): Johannes Ockeghem, a Most Medieval Musician.” Tijdschrift van de Koninklijke Vereniging voor Nederlandse Muziekgeschiedenis, Deel 47, No. 1/2, Johannes Ockeghem, pp. 163–200. Koninklijke Vereniging voor Nederlandse Muziekgeschiedenis, 1997,

External links 
 Score at IMSLP - Besseler edition - Note: It is transposed and contains questionable application of musica ficta

Compositions by Johannes Ockeghem
Renaissance music
Masses (music)